Humberto Díaz Casanueva (1906–1992) was a Chilean poet, diplomat, and educator. He won the Chilean National Prize for Literature in 1971. He was appointed by President Salvador Allende as Permanent Representative of Chile to the United Nations, serving from 1970 until the 1973 coup d'état.

References

1906 births
1992 deaths
Chilean male writers
Permanent Representatives of Chile to the United Nations
National Prize for Literature (Chile) winners